Richford is a town in Tioga County, New York, United States. The population was 1,052 at the 2020 census. The town is named after Ezekial Rich, an early settler and benefactor of the town.

The Town of Richford is the northernmost town in the county and is southeast of Ithaca.

History
Settlement began around 1808 when Evan Harris brought his family here. Samuel Smith was the first to settle within the present village site in 1813. The first tavern was built in the village in 1817 at the site of the Richford Hotel (now the Richford Quickway) by Beriah Wells. Ezekial Rich moved to the town in 1821 when he purchased the tavern from Beriah Wells. He established a glove and mitten factory, and later opened a general store. The town was first formed from the Town of Berkshire as the "Town of Arlington" in 1831. In 1832 it changed its name to the Town of Richford.

Local oral history links several properties in Richford with the Underground Railroad.

In 1816, the Catskill Turnpike was brought through the village on its route to Ithaca bringing considerable traffic to the village.
This was the dominant route into or out of the village until 1869, when the Southern Central Railroad was completed between Auburn and Owego.

Geography

The West Branch of the Owego Creek forms the western border of the town while the East Branch runs along the eastern edge of the village itself at the base of Geer Hill. Several spring-fed ponds exist on the hilltops, especially at Clarks.

A large portion of the town is hilly, with many of the highest elevations (+1,400 ft) in the county. The highest elevation (1,994 ft) in Tioga County is within the town, an unnamed hill just to the north of the intersection of Creamery Rd and Robinson Hollow Rd in Robinson Hollow State Forest.

Richford lies on the southern edge of the snowbelt, averaging . It receives  of rain, and has, on average, 154 sunny days per year.

The western border is with Tompkins County.  The north border is Cortland County, and the eastern border is Broome County. Berkshire lies to the south.

New York State Route 38 (north-south) intersects New York State Route 79 (east-west) at Richford village.

Demographics

As of the census of 2000, there were 1,170 people, 440 households, and 315 families residing in the town.  The population density was 30.7 people per square mile (11.8/km2).  There were 502 housing units at an average density of 13.2 per square mile (5.1/km2).  The racial makeup of the town was 98.89% White, 0.17% African American, 0.09% Native American, 0.09% Pacific Islander, and 0.77% from two or more races. Hispanic or Latino of any race were 0.77% of the population.

There were 440 households, out of which 34.8% had children under the age of 18 living with them, 53.2% were married couples living together, 12.3% had a female householder with no husband present, and 28.4% were non-families. 22.3% of all households were made up of individuals, and 8.6% had someone living alone who was 65 years of age or older.  The average household size was 2.66 and the average family size was 3.09.

In the town, the population was spread out, with 27.9% under the age of 18, 7.5% from 18 to 24, 30.9% from 25 to 44, 23.8% from 45 to 64, and 9.8% who were 65 years of age or older.  The median age was 37 years. For every 100 females, there were 97.0 males.  For every 100 females age 18 and over, there were 100.2 males.

The median income for a household in the town was $34,130, and the median income for a family was $38,750. Males had a median income of $28,661 versus $23,667 for females. The per capita income for the town was $15,331.  About 12.4% of families and 13.8% of the population were below the poverty line, including 18.5% of those under age 18 and 7.3% of those age 65 or over.

Recreation

Annual Potato Festival
Named in honor of the Clarks Seed Farm, this festival is held every year on the third Saturday of September to celebrate the significance of potato farming in Richford's history. Arts and crafts vendors are available as are games and races. The event is known for its potato themed dishes including potato ice-cream, which used to be made by Cornell University dairy with chocolate-covered potato sticks in vanilla ice cream. Now there are two varieties made by Jones' Humdinger: the original and a mashed sweet potato based version.

Broome-Tioga Sports Center
An AMA and Non-AMA sanctioned Off Road Racing Facility located on the border with Broome County. The track host several events including Motorcycle, Snowmobile and ATV/UTV Races. Mud Bogs, Mud Drags, Hill climbs, and demolition derbies, ATV and UTV Racing, A Trail Riding Facility, as well as classic car shows.

State lands

 Michigan Hill State Forest: Located east of the village and north of RT 79. Encompasses  of wilderness area. There are no maintained trails. In several areas along Rockefeller Rd, the ruins of old settlements and farms can be found, usually consisting of old foundations and orchards, but the occasional uncovered well exists.
John D Rockefeller's birthplace is within Griggs Gulf on Rockefeller Rd. An unkempt nature trail built by a local 4-H group begins here and passes several old structures including a mill and other foundations.
 Turkey Hill State Forest: Shared with the town of Berkshire, this forest is located East and south of Richford. Extensive damage in the 2003 ice storms created large areas of early successional habitats that foster a wide variety of birds and other woodland creatures.
 Robinson Hollow State Forest:  just west of Richford. Many recreational facilities exist including  of marked trails maintained by local associations, and a portion of the Finger Lakes Trail runs through the forest. The Kimmee lean-to maintained by the Finger Lakes Trail Conference is located here. A  trout pond exists and there are extensive fishing areas along the West Branch Owego Creek. Many of the highest elevations in the county are within the forest, including the highest.
Contains  of maintained trails and a  public access road.
 Andersen Hill State Forest:  just south of the village proper, west of Rt 38. The forest consists of managed woodlands that maintain a mix of early, mid, and late successional forests. A short (.5 mile) maintained trail exists that connects to a larger trail network in adjacent lands, and a  forest access road is available. An access point to the West Branch Owego Creek is maintained within the forest.
The large number of state-owned lands provide for excellent hiking and motorized sports activities. Many 4-wheeler and snowmobile tracks criss-cross the woodlands on both state and private land.

Many great fishing sites are available in Richford. Native and stock trout thrive in the cold waters of both branches of the Owego Creek with some of the best areas in and around Richford. The NYSDEC annually releases over 10000 brown trout into both branches in Richford. Additionally, 200 rainbow trout are released into the Tri-County Pond.

Hunting is also popular within the town. All state lands are open to hunting and provide excellent habitats to large populations of deer, turkey, and other game animals.

Communities and locations in the Town of Richford
Dunhamville – A former location, south of Richford village.
East Richford – A location on NY-79 (Catskill Turnpike), east of Richford village.
Hubby Creek – A small stream flowing out from the southern part of the town.
Richford – A hamlet at the junction of NY- 38 and NY-79 in the southwestern part of the town.  The East Branch of Owego Creek flows past the village.

Notable people
John D. Rockefeller (July 8, 1839 – May 23, 1937), Oil titan, philanthropist, founder of the Standard Oil company, and the richest man in modern history, was born in this town and returned to visit during the summer. The foundation of his childhood home is located adjacent to Rockefeller Road on land that is now part of Griggs Gulf State Forest, and is marked by a sign which designates the historical site.
Gurdon Wattles (May 12, 1855 - January 31, 1932), known for bankrolling much of early Hollywood, was born in Richford in 1855. He moved to Glidden, Iowa following the Civil War.

References

External links
 Town of Richford
 Richford history 
 Broome-Tioga Sports Center
 Visit Tioga

Binghamton metropolitan area
Towns in Tioga County, New York
Populated places on the Underground Railroad